Live Tour 2001: Deep Forest is the name of Do As Infinity's first concert DVD. It was recorded on December the 4th 2001 and released on March 20, 2002. The concert was held at Shibuya Kokaido.

Track listing
 
 
 "Get yourself"
 "Desire"
 
 
 
 "Snail"
 "Painful"
 "Tangerine Dream"
 
 
 "Yesterday & Today"
 
 
 "135"
 "Summer Days"
 "Week!"
 
 "We are."

External links
 Live Tour 2001: Deep Forest official listing 

Do As Infinity video albums